This article covers the period of the history of Sudan between 1985 and 2019 when the Sudanese Defense Minister Abdel Rahman Swar al-Dahab seized power from Sudanese President Jaafar  Nimeiry in the 1985 Sudanese coup d'état. Not long after, Lieutenant General Omar al-Bashir, backed by an Islamist political party, the National Islamic Front, overthrew the short lived government in a coup in 1989 where he ruled as President until his fall in April 2019. During Bashir's rule, also referred to as Bashirist Sudan, he was re-elected three times while overseeing the independence of South Sudan in 2011. His regime was criticized for human rights abuses, atrocities and genocide in Darfur and allegations of harboring and supporting terrorist groups (most notably during the residency of Osama bin Laden from 1992 to 1996) in the region while being subjected to United Nations sanctions beginning in 1995, resulting in Sudan's isolation as an international pariah.

First coalition
In June 1986, Sadiq al-Mahdi formed a coalition government with the National Umma Party (NUP), the Democratic Unionist Party (DUP), the National Islamic Front (NIF), and four southern parties. Unfortunately, however, Sadiq proved to be a weak leader and incapable of governing the country. Party factionalism, corruption, personal rivalries, scandals, and political instability characterized the Sadiq regime. After less than a year in office, Sadiq dismissed the government because it had failed to draft a new penal code to replace the sharia, reach an agreement with the IMF, end the civil war in the south, or devise a scheme to attract remittances from Sudanese expatriates. To retain the support of the DUP and the southern political parties, Sadiq formed another ineffective coalition government.

Second coalition
Instead of removing the ministers who had been associated with the failures of the first coalition government, Sadiq retained thirteen of them, of whom eleven kept their previous portfolios. As a result, many Sudanese rejected the second coalition government as being a replica of the first. To make matters worse, Sadiq and DUP leader Al-Khatim signed an inadequate memorandum of understanding that fixed the new government's priorities as affirming the application of the sharia to Muslims, consolidating the Islamic banking system, and changing the national flag and national emblem. Furthermore, the memorandum directed the government to remove former leader Nimeiry's name from all institutions and dismiss all officials appointed by Nimeiry to serve in international and regional organizations. As expected, anti-government elements criticized the memorandum for not mentioning the civil war, famine, or the country's disintegrating social and economic conditions.

In August 1987, the DUP brought down the government because Sadiq opposed the appointment of a DUP member, Ahmad as Sayid, to the Supreme Commission. For the next nine months, Sadiq and Mirghani failed to agree on the composition of another coalition government. During this period, Sadiq moved closer to the NIF. However, the NIF refused to join a coalition government that included leftist elements. Moreover, Turabi indicated that the formation of a coalition government would depend on numerous factors, the most important of which were the resignation or dismissal of those serving in senior positions in the central and regional governments, the lifting of the state of emergency reimposed in July 1987, and the continuation of the Constituent Assembly.

Third coalition
Because of the endless debate over these issues, it was not until May 15, 1988, that a new coalition government emerged headed by Sadiq al Mahdi. Members of this coalition included the Umma, the DUP, the NIF, and some southern parties. As in the past, however, the coalition quickly disintegrated because of political bickering among its members. Major disagreements included the NIF's demand that it be given the post of commissioner of Khartoum, the inability to establish criteria for the selection of regional governors, and the NIF's opposition to the replacement of senior military officers and the chief of staff of the executive branch.

In August 1988, severe flooding occurred in Khartoum.

In November 1988, another more explosive political issue emerged when Mirghani and the SPLM signed an agreement in Addis Ababa that included provisions for a cease-fire, the freezing of the sharia, the lifting of the state of emergency, and the abolition of all foreign political and military pacts. The two sides also proposed to convene a constitutional conference to decide Sudan's political future. The NIF opposed this agreement because of its stand on the sharia. When the government refused to support the agreement, the DUP withdrew from the coalition. Shortly thereafter armed forces commander in chief Lieutenant General Fathi Ahmad Ali presented an ultimatum, signed by 150 senior military officers, to Sadiq al Mahdi demanding that he make the coalition government more representative and that he announce terms for ending the civil war.

Fall Of al Mahdi And Brief NIF Regime
On March 11, 1989, Sadiq al Mahdi responded to this pressure by dissolving the government. The new coalition had included the Umma, the DUP, and representatives of southern parties and the trade unions. The NIF refused to join the coalition because the coalition was not committed to enforcing the sharia. Sadiq claimed his new government was committed to ending the southern civil war by implementing the November 1988 DUP-SPLM agreement. He also promised to mobilize government resources to bring food relief to famine areas, reduce the government's international debt, and build a national political consensus.

Sadiq's inability to live up to these promises eventually caused his downfall. On June 30, 1989, Colonel (later Lieutenant General) Umar Hassan Ahmad al Bashir overthrew Sadiq and established the Revolutionary Command Council for National Salvation to rule Sudan. Bashir's commitment to imposing the sharia on the non-Muslim south and to seeking a military victory over the SPLA, however, seemed likely to keep the country divided for the foreseeable future and hamper resolution of the same problems faced by Sadiq al Mahdi. Moreover, the emergence of the NIF as a political force made compromise with the south more unlikely.

The Revolutionary Command Council dissolved itself in October 1993. Its powers were devolved to the President (al Bashir declared himself the President) and the Transitional National Assembly.

Conflict in the south, Darfur conflict and conflict with Chad
The civil war in the south had displaced more than 4 million southerners. Some fled into southern cities, such as Juba; others trekked as far north as Khartoum and even into Ethiopia, Kenya, Uganda, Egypt, and other neighboring countries. These people were unable to grow food or earn money to feed themselves, and malnutrition and starvation became widespread. The lack of investment in the south resulted as well in what international humanitarian organizations call a “lost generation” who lack educational opportunities, access to basic health care services, and little prospects for productive employment in the small and weak economies of the south or the north.

In early 2003 a new rebellion of Sudan Liberation Movement/Army (SLM/A) and Justice and Equality Movement (JEM) groups in the western region of Darfur began. The rebels accused the central government of neglecting the Darfur region, although there is uncertainty regarding the objectives of the rebels and whether they merely seek an improved position for Darfur within Sudan or outright secession. Both the government and the rebels have been accused of atrocities in this war, although most of the blame has fallen on Arab militias (Janjaweed) allied with the government. The rebels have alleged that these militias have been engaging in ethnic cleansing in Darfur, and the fighting has displaced hundreds of thousands of people, many of them seeking refuge in neighboring Chad. There are various estimates on the number of human casualties, ranging from under twenty thousand to several hundred thousand dead, from either direct combat or starvation and disease inflicted by the conflict.

In 2004 Chad brokered negotiations in N'Djamena, leading to the April 8 Humanitarian Ceasefire Agreement between the Sudanese government, the JEM, and the SLA.  However, the conflict continued despite the ceasefire, and the African Union (AU) formed a Ceasefire Commission (CFC) to monitor its observance. In August 2004, the African Union sent 150 Rwandan troops in to protect the ceasefire monitors. It, however, soon became apparent that 150 troops would not be enough, so they were joined by 150 Nigerian troops.

On September 18, 2004 United Nations Security Council issued Resolution 1564 declaring that the government of Sudan had not met its commitments, expressing concern at helicopter attacks and assaults by the Janjaweed militia against villages in Darfur. It welcomed the intention of the African Union to enhance its monitoring mission in Darfur and urged all member states to support such efforts. During 2005 the African Union Mission in Sudan force was increased to about 7,000.
 
The Chadian-Sudanese conflict officially started on December 23, 2005, when the government of Chad declared a state of war with Sudan and called for the citizens of Chad to mobilize themselves against Rally for Democracy and Liberty (RDL) militants (Chadian rebels backed by the Sudanese government) and Sudanese militiamen who attacked villages and towns in eastern Chad, stealing cattle, murdering citizens, and burning houses.

Peace talks between the southern rebels and the government made substantial progress in 2003 and early 2004, although skirmishes in parts of the south have reportedly continued. The two sides have agreed that, following a final peace treaty, southern Sudan will enjoy autonomy for six years, and after the expiration of that period, the people of southern Sudan will be able to vote in a referendum on independence. Furthermore, oil revenues will be divided equally between the government and rebels during the six-year interim period. The ability or willingness of the government to fulfill these promises has been questioned by some observers, however, and the status of three central and eastern provinces was a point of contention in the negotiations. Some observers wondered whether hard line elements in the north would allow the treaty to proceed.

A final peace treaty was signed on 9 January 2005 in Nairobi. The terms of the peace treaty are as follows:
The south will have autonomy for six years, followed by a referendum on secession.
Both sides of the conflict will merge their armed forces into a 39,000-strong force after six years, if the secession referendum should turn out negative.
Income from oilfields is to be shared evenly between north and south.
Jobs are to be split according to varying ratios (central administration: 70 to 30, Abyei/Blue Nile State/Nuba mountains: 55 to 45, both in favour of the government).
Islamic law is to remain in the north, while continued use of the sharia in the south is to be decided by the elected assembly.

On 31 August 2006, the United Nations Security Council approved Resolution 1706 to send a new peacekeeping force of 17,300 to Darfur. In the following months, however, UNMIS was not able to deploy to Darfur due to the Government of Sudan's steadfast opposition to a peacekeeping operation undertaken solely by the United Nations. The UN then embarked on an alternative, innovative approach to try to begin stabilize the region through the phased strengthening of AMIS, before transfer of authority to a joint African Union/United Nations peacekeeping operation. Following prolonged and intensive negotiations with the Government of Sudan and significant international pressure, the Government of Sudan finally accepted the peacekeeping operation in Darfur.

In 2009 the International Criminal Court issued an arrest warrant for al-Bashir, accusing him of crimes against humanity and war crimes.

In 2009 and 2010 a series of conflicts between rival nomadic tribes in South Kordofan caused a large number of casualties and displaced thousands.

An agreement for the restoration of harmony between Chad and Sudan, signed January 15, 2010, marked the end of a five-year war between them.

The Sudanese government and the JEM signed a ceasefire agreement ending the Darfur conflict in February, 2010.

In January 2011 referendum on independence for Southern Sudan was held, and the South voted overwhelmingly to secede later that year as the Republic of South Sudan, with its capital at Juba and Kiir Mayardit as its first president. Al-Bashir announced that he accepted the result, but violence soon erupted in the disputed region of Abyei, claimed by both the North and the South.

On June 6, 2011 armed conflict broke out in South Kordofan between the forces of Northern and Southern Sudan, ahead of the scheduled independence of the South on July 9.  This followed an agreement for both sides to withdraw from Abyei. On June, 20 the parties agreed to demilitarize the contested area of Abyei where Ethiopian peacekeepers will be deployed.

On July 9, 2011, South Sudan became an independent country.

Final years

The 2018–2021 Arab protests hit Sudan in December 2018 and on 11 April 2019, Bashir was deposed ending the regime and installing the Sovereignty Council of Sudan until the transition to democracy in 2022.

See also
History of Sudan

References

Further reading
 Woodward, Peter, ed. Sudan After Nimeiri (2013); since 1984  excerpt and text search

Sources

Coalition governments
History of Sudan by period
Sudan